John Augustus Blume (April 8, 1909 – March 1, 2002) was an American structural engineer born in Gonzales, California.  He first decided he wanted to study earthquake engineering when he witnessed the Santa Barbara earthquake of 1925. In 1929, he went to Stanford University, where he later received his A.B.degree, his graduate degree of engineer and his doctorate.

Blume's career included major contributions to dynamic theory, soil structure interactions, and the inelastic behavior of structures, earning him the title of the “Father of Earthquake Engineering.”  Blume died at the age of 92 at his Hillsborough, California home on March 1, 2002.

See also 
George W Housner
Maurice Anthony Biot

Notes

References 

 Blume, John A. Interview with Stanley Scott. Connections: The EERI Oral History Series. 1994.
 
 

1909 births
2002 deaths
Structural engineers
Stanford University alumni
American civil engineers
20th-century American engineers